San Juan Capistrano (Spanish for "St. John of Capistrano") is a city in Orange County, California, located along the Orange Coast. The population was 34,593 at the 2010 census.

San Juan Capistrano was founded by the Spanish in 1776, when St. Junípero Serra established Mission San Juan Capistrano. Extensive damage caused by the 1812 Capistrano earthquake caused the community to decline. Following the Mexican secularization act of 1833, the mission village officially became a town and was briefly renamed as San Juan de Argüello. Following the American Conquest of California, San Juan remained a small, rural town until the 20th century; the restoration of the mission in the 1910–20s transformed the town into a tourist destination and a backdrop for Hollywood films.

History

Indigenous 
The region was populated by the Acjachemen, referred to by the Spanish as Juaneños, an Indigenous Californian nation. They lived in the area for approximately 10,000 years, with some of their oldest villages being confirmed as over 9,600 years old. The mother village of Putuidem was located in what is now San Juan Capistrano, as well as the village of Acjacheme.

Spanish era
San Juan Capistrano was established by the Spanish in 1776, when Saint Junípero Serra founded Mission San Juan Capistrano, the seventh of the Spanish missions in California. The mission was built less than 60 yards from the village of Acjacheme, which was exploited as a source of labor for the mission. The mission was named after St. John of Capistrano, a 14th-15th century Franciscan saint. The 1812 San Juan Capistrano earthquake resulted in the deaths of thirty-nine Acjachemen people, thirty-one of whom were women, when the stone church at the Mission collapsed.

Mexican era

The Mexican Congress of the Union enacted the secularization of the Californian missions in 1833. In the mission period, 4,317 natives had been baptized at the mission (1,689 adults and 2,628 children). In that same period, 3,158 of those baptized had died. Some of the native people who survived the mission period continued to live at the mission for a short period after the secularization act, while others settled in the surrounding areas.

Each mission was appointed an administrator to oversee the transfer of the missions and their lands from the Franciscan Order to the Mexican authorities. Santiago Argüello, a member of a prominent family of Californios, was appointed administrator of Mission San Juan Capistrano. During his tenure, the community was briefly renamed "San Juan de Argüello", similar to what happened to San Juan Bautista in Northern California, which was briefly renamed "San Juan de Castro" after its administrator José Castro.

In 1844 Don Juan Forster and James McKinley purchased the former Mission San Juan Capistrano at public auction. Forster made his home here until 1864, when the mission was returned to the Catholic Church by president Abraham Lincoln.

American era

Following the American Conquest of California, San Juan remained a relatively small and rural community until the end of the 19th century.

Padre O'Sullivan arrived in San Juan Capistrano in 1910 to recuperate from a recent stroke. He became fascinated by Mission San Juan Capistrano and soon set to work on rebuilding it a section at a time. O'Sullivan repaired the roof of the Serra Chapel using California sycamore logs to match those that were used in the original work. He brought in architect Arthur B. Benton of Los Angeles to strengthen the chapel walls through the addition of heavy masonry buttresses. The centerpiece of the chapel restoration was its retablo, imported from Barcelona in 1806 and donated by the Bishop of Los Angeles.

The restoration of the mission resulted in San Juan Capistrano's emergence as a tourist destination, owing to its historic architecture and proximity to the sea. The mission was used often in Hollywood productions, such as D.W. Griffith's 1910 western film The Two Brothers, the first film ever shot in Orange County. San Juan incorporated as a city on April 19, 1961.

From 2009 to 2017, the famous swallows did not return to San Juan Capistrano, instead migrating to the Chino Hills, north of San Juan Capistrano. The swallows changed their route because the mission is no longer the tallest building in the area due to urban sprawl, and thus stopped attracting the swallows for nesting. Mission San Juan Capistrano embarked on a program to facilitate the return of the swallows, first by using swallow calls to attract the birds and then by building artificial swallow nests for the birds to use. As of 2017, the cliff swallows have returned home to Mission San Juan Capistrano and are still celebrated each year at the town's annual Swallows Day Parade and Mercado Street Fair. In 2018, the town celebrated its 80th annual Swallows Day Parade and Fiesta de las Golondrinas (Spanish for "Festival of the Swallows"). The event holds the title of being the longest-running and largest non-motorized parade west of the Mississippi.

Geography

San Juan Capistrano is located in south Orange County and is bisected by Interstate 5.

Climate

Demographics

2020
The 2020 United States Census reported a population of 35,253. The racial makeup was 70.6% White, .7% African American, 3.6% Asian, and 37.3% Hispanic or Latino of any race.

2010

At the 2010 census San Juan Capistrano had a population of 34,593. The racial makeup of San Juan Capistrano was 26,664 (77.1%) White (55.8% Non-Hispanic White), 193 (0.6%) African American, 286 (0.8%) Native American, 975 (2.8%) Asian, 33 (0.1%) Pacific Islander, 5,234 (15.1%) from other races, and 1,208 (3.5%) from two or more races. Hispanic or Latino of any race were 13,388 persons (38.7%).

The census reported that 34,506 people (99.7% of the population) lived in households, and 87 (0.3%) lived in non-institutionalized group quarters.

There were 11,394 households, 4,030 (35.4%) had children under the age of 18 living in them, 6,706 (58.9%) were opposite-sex married couples living together, 1,089 (9.6%) had a female householder with no husband present, 526 (4.6%) had a male householder with no wife present. There were 456 (4.0%) unmarried opposite-sex partnerships, and 87 (0.8%) same-sex married couples or partnerships. 2,381 households (20.9%) were one person and 1,407 (12.3%) had someone living alone who was 65 or older. The average household size was 3.03. There were 8,321 families (73.0% of households); the average family size was 3.44.

The age distribution was 8,518 people (24.6%) under the age of 18, 3,066 people (8.9%) aged 18 to 24, 7,804 people (22.6%) aged 25 to 44, 9,792 people (28.3%) aged 45 to 64, and 5,413 people (15.6%) who were 65 or older. The median age was 40.2 years. For every 100 females, there were 98.3 males. For every 100 females age 18 and over, there were 96.7 males.

There were 11,940 housing units at an average density of 835.2 per square mile, of the occupied units 8,462 (74.3%) were owner-occupied and 2,932 (25.7%) were rented. The homeowner vacancy rate was 1.3%; the rental vacancy rate was 4.7%. 24,052 people (69.5% of the population) lived in owner-occupied housing units and 10,454 people (30.2%) lived in rental housing units.

According to the 2010 United States Census, San Juan Capistrano had a median household income of $75,356, with 12.7% of the population living below the federal poverty line.

2000

As of the census of 2000, there were 33,826 people in 10,930 households, including 8,196 families, in the city.  The population density was 2,381.2 inhabitants per square mile (919.1/km2). There were 11,320 housing units at an average density of 307.6 persons/km2 (796.9 persons/mi2). The racial makeup of the city was 78.47% White, 0.78% African American, 1.07% Native American, 1.92% Asian, 0.11% Pacific Islander, 14.21% from other races, and 3.43% from two or more races. 33.13% of the population were Hispanic or Latino of any race.

Of the 10,930 households, 39.9% had children under the age of 18 living with them, 62.7% were married couples living together, 8.5% had a female householder with no husband present, and 25.0% were non-families. 19.7% of households were one person and 10.3% were one person aged 65 or older. The average household size was 3.06 and the average family size was 3.45.

The age distribution was 28.1% under the age of 18, 7.8% from 18 to 24, 27.3% from 25 to 44, 23.7% from 45 to 64, and 13.1% 65 or older. The median age was 36 years. For every 100 females, there were 96.9 males. For every 100 females age 18 and over, there were 94.0 males.

The median household income was $62,392 and the median family income  was $69,481. Males had a median income of $47,574 versus $34,821 for females. The per capita income for the city was $29,926. About 10.7% of the population and 6.6% of families were below the poverty line, including 14.8% of those under age 18 and 4.2% of those age 65 or over.

Economy

San Juan Capistrano is home to over 1,700 businesses. The city's unemployment rate was at 3.7% as of December 2017.

Top employers
According to the city's Comprehensive Annual Financial Report from June 30, 2020, the largest employers in the city are:

Arts and culture

San Juan Capistrano is also known for its cliff swallows. The protected birds return during migration, which originates in the town of Goya, Argentina, around St. Joseph's Day (March 19) each year. The day is celebrated by the city's annual Swallows' Day Parade and other festive events.  The swallows leave around October 23, the former feast day of St. John of Capistrano. The 1940 hit song "When the Swallows Come Back to Capistrano", written by Leon René, is a love song inspired by this annual event.

The Serra Chapel at the mission is the oldest in-use building in California. San Juan was also the site of one of the first places to produce Californian wine.

Completed in 2021, it commemorates the history of the people called the Juaneño by the Spanish colonizers.

Government

As of April 2022, the City Council members are: Derek Reeve, (Mayor), Howard Hart, (Mayor Pro Team), John Taylor, Sergio Farias and Troy Bourne.

The current city manager is Benjamin Siegel.

Education

San Juan Capistrano is served by Capistrano Unified School District. In the 2007–08 academic year, San Juan Hills High School opened with about 600 freshman students. It is the city's only public high school, although a sizeable portion of San Juan Capistrano's residents attend high schools in neighboring cities since the schools in most of its neighboring cities are also under Capistrano Unified School District which is the second largest school district in Orange County.

San Juan has four public elementary schools (grades K–5): Del Obispo Elementary School, Harold Ambuehl Elementary School, Kinoshita Elementary School, and San Juan Elementary School. The local public middle school (grades 6–8) is Marco Forster Middle School. Capistrano Valley High School (grades 9–12) lies just outside of the city's borders, but serves many of the city's students.
A public continuation high school, Junipero Serra High School, also serves the area. 

San Juan also has six private, non-secular schools. Capistrano Valley Christian Schools (grades pre-K – 12), Saddleback Valley Christian School (grades pre-K – 12), St. Margaret's Episcopal School (grades pre-K – 12), and JSerra Catholic High School (grades 9–12). Mission Basilica School (grades K–8) is located on the historic Mission grounds, utilizes some of the historic buildings as classrooms, and is part of Mission Basilica San Juan Capistrano. The other is Rancho Capistrano Christian School (grades K–8), located off Interstate 5 on Saddleback Church's south campus.

San Juan also has a private, secular school, Fairmont School (grade K - 12), located close to San Juan Capistrano Mission.

Media
San Juan Capistrano is served by two newspapers, the Capistrano Valley News (owned by the Orange County Register) and The Capistrano Dispatch. The Capistrano Valley News runs once weekly on Thursdays and The Dispatch runs on the second and fourth Fridays of each month.

The San Juan Capistrano Patch, an online-only news website, also serves the city.

Transportation

The Orange County Transportation Authority (OCTA) operates bus routes within the city, connecting it to other parts of Orange County.

Rail
The San Juan Capistrano station is served by Amtrak and Metrolink. The station is located one block away from the historic San Juan Capistrano Mission next to Los Rios Street in downtown San Juan Capistrano. Its proximity to the city's tourist attractions makes it a popular stop during the summer months.

Highways

 Interstate 5 has three interchanges completely located in the city (at Camino Capistrano, SR 74/Ortega Highway, and Junipero Serra Road), two interchanges partially located within the city (at SR 1/Camino las Ramblas (which is partially within Dana Point) as well as SR 73 (which is partially within Mission Viejo)), and an additional northbound entrance ramp from Stonehill Drive and Camino Capistrano.

 Pacific Coast Highway is one of the most notable state routes in California. It is often incorrectly referenced that SR 1 terminates in nearby Dana Point because the city borders the Pacific Ocean (unlike San Juan Capistrano). In reality, SR 1 terminates shortly after it junctions with Interstate 5, crossing within San Juan Capistrano city limits (although this is a few hundred feet away from the city limits of Dana Point). There is an official SR 1 terminus sign on a traffic light pole along the southbound lanes on SR 1 shortly after crossing under Interstate 5 which is within San Juan Capistrano city limits.

 California State Route 73 southbound terminates at I-5 in San Juan Capistrano, while the northbound direction begins at I-5. There are no exits along SR 73 in San Juan Capistrano other than its junction with Interstate 5.

 California State Route 74 has its official western terminus at Interstate 5 in San Juan Capistrano. The city-maintained road that continues west as Ortega Highway originally terminated at Camino Capistrano in front of Mission San Juan Capistrano; however, interchange reconstruction that was completed in 2015 brought Ortega Highway to continue onto Del Obispo Street towards Dana Point, with a right turn required to stay on the older portion of Ortega Highway.

 California State Route 241, which originally terminated at Oso Parkway between Las Flores and Coto de Caza, was extended roughly 4 miles to Cow Camp Road in the community of Rancho Mission Viejo, which is located just east of the city limits.

 The original route of U.S. 101 ran through downtown San Juan Capistrano on what is now Camino Capistrano. It was decommissioned when Interstate 5 was completed in the 1950s.

Sister cities
 Capestrano, Italy 

 Ensenada, Mexico

Notable people 
 Austin Hedges, MLB Catcher
 Kyle Hendricks, Chicago Cubs
 Anthony Cumia, radio host and podcaster
 Norm Sherry (1931–2021), catcher, manager, and coach in Major League Baseball
 Modesta Avila (1867–1891), Californio ranchera and protester

References

External links

 
 San Juan Capistrano Chamber of Commerce
 Visit San Juan Capistrano

 
1961 establishments in California
Cities in Orange County, California
Incorporated cities and towns in California
Populated places established in 1776
Spanish mission settlements in North America